Beklik (also Romanized as Beklīk; also known as Beglīg, Beyglīk, and Qareh Chāy) is a village in Rudbar Rural District, in the Central District of Tafresh County, Markazi Province, Iran. At the 2006 census, its population was 111, in 41 families.

References 

Populated places in Tafresh County